Bang Bang is an album by country music artist Kelly Willis, released in 1991 on MCA Records. It received little attention from country radio, although it was the biggest-selling of her three MCA albums. It includes the Billboard minor country hit "Baby Take a Piece of My Heart," which rose to #51 on the charts.

Track listing
"I'll Try Again" (Jim Lauderdale, Monte Warden) – 2:55
"Too Much to Ask" (Mas Palermo) – 3:10
"The Heart That Love Forgot" (Kostas, Palermo) – 3:07
"Sincerely (Too Late to Turn Back Now)" (Steve Earle, Robert Earl Keen) – 4:39
"Baby Take a Piece of My Heart" (Kostas, Kelly Willis) – 3:44
"Bang Bang" (Clavelle Isnard) – 3:16
"Hidden Things" (Paul Kelly) – 4:08
"Not Afraid of the Dark" (Lauderdale) – 4:36
"Standing by the River" (Tom Clifford) – 3:09
"Settle for Love" (Joe Ely) – 3:40

Personnel
All information taken from allmusic.
Kelly Willis: Lead Vocals
Richard Bennett, Bernie Leadon: Acoustic Guitar
Bernie Leadon, Steuart Smith: Electric Guitar
Steuart Smith: Slide Guitar
Paul Franklin: Steel Guitar
John Barlow Jarvis: Keyboards
Leland Sklar, Michael Rhodes, Brad Fordham: Bass guitar
Larrie Londin, Mas Palermo: Drums, Percussion
Harry Stinson, Billy Thomas, Anthony Crawford, Kelly Willis: Background Vocals

References

1991 albums
Kelly Willis albums
Albums produced by Tony Brown (record producer)
MCA Records albums